Tabbara is an Arabic surname. People with the surname include:

Bahij Tabbara (born 1929), Lebanese politician
Hani Bahjat Tabbara (born 1939), Jordanian diplomat
 Khaled Tabbara, member of the American Indie pop duo, Munnycat
Marwan Tabbara (born 1984), Canadian politician
Saïd bin Saïd Tabbara (died 2016), Bahraini-Lebanese educator
Yaser Tabbara, Syrian American lawyer

Arabic-language surnames